CAF or caf may refer to:

Armed forces
Canadian Armed Forces (Canadian Forces), the Canadian Air Force, Army, and Navy
Canadian Air Force, now the Royal Canadian Air Force
Republic of China Air Force, the air force of the Republic of China (Taiwan)
Chief of Air Force (Australia), the commander of the Royal Australian Air Force
Cactus Air Force, an American aviation force in the Battle of Guadalcanal
Croatian Armed Forces, the Croatian Air Force, Army and Navy
Continental Air Force, a former major command of the United States Army Air Forces

Computing and networking
Canadian Access Federation, a service of CANARIE Inc
SAP Composite Application Framework, a tool by SAP AG
Core Audio Format, a file format from Apple for storing audio data
Coarray Fortran, a parallel extension to Fortran language

Organisations

Governmental organisations
Caisse d'allocations familiales, French governmental agencies for family-supporting subsidies
Centro Andaluz de la Fotografía, a photography institution based in Almeria
Congressional Award Foundation, a public-private organization which recognizes youth achievement in the United States

Political organisations
Campaign for America's Future, an American political organization
Pentapartito, an Italian political coalition

Sport organisations
Club alpin français, French mountain club
Confederation of African Football, the governing body for association football in Africa
Challenged Athletes Foundation, a US nonprofit foundation

Transnational organisations
Central African Federation, a federation of Rhodesia and Nyasaland between 1953 and 1963
CAF – Development Bank of Latin America (Corporación Andina de Fomento), Latin American development bank

Other organisations
Canadian Arab Federation, a group representing Arab Canadians
Charities Aid Foundation, a UK charity
Commemorative Air Force, a Texas-based organisation that preserves and shows historical aircraft; formerly known as the Confederate Air Force
Construcciones y Auxiliar de Ferrocarriles, a Spanish rail equipment manufacturer
Cooley's Anemia Foundation, United States non-profit organisation

Science
 Calcium fluoride, a chemical compound
 Cancer-associated fibroblast, a tumorous cell type
 Cellular angiofibroma, a benign tumor of superficial soft tissues
 CHAF1A (chromatin assembly factor-1), a protein complex maintaining chromatin
 Conductive anodic filament, an electrochemical migration-type failure in printed circuit boards

Other uses
 Central African Republic, by ISO 3166-1 country code
 Common Assessment Framework, an EU tool to bring quality improvements to public sector services
 Community Adjustment Fund, part of the 2009 Canadian federal budget
 Canadian Fur, pronounced as 胳肋底毛 in Cantonese  spoken in Hong Kong  and Macau .

See also
 Cafe (disambiguation)
 CAFS (disambiguation)
 Qaf (disambiguation)